David Vann is the name of:
 David Vann (mayor) (1928–2000), mayor of Birmingham, Alabama
 David Vann (Cherokee leader) (1800–1863), Treasurer of the Cherokee Nation
 David Vann (writer) (born 1966), writer, sailor and creative writing professor at the University of Warwick